This was the first edition of the tournament.

Sharon Fichman and Nina Stojanović won the title, defeating Jeļena Ostapenko and Galina Voskoboeva in the final, 2–6, 7–6(7–1), [10–6].

Seeds

Draw

Draw

References

Sources
Main Draw

Baltic Open - Doubles
2019 Doubles